Jesper Saltvik Pedersen (born 23 August 1999) is a para-alpine skier. He is a six-time medalist, including four gold medals, at the Winter Paralympics.

Career
He won gold for Norway at the 2018 Winter Paralympics in his giant slalom event.

He competed at the 2021 World Para Snow Sports Championships and he won five medals, including three gold medals, in para-alpine skiing.

He represented Norway at the 2022 Winter Paralympics and won four gold medals and one silver medal. He was the only competitor to win four gold medals at the Games.

References

External links 
 

1999 births
Living people
Norwegian male alpine skiers
Paralympic alpine skiers of Norway
Paralympic gold medalists for Norway
Paralympic silver medalists for Norway
Paralympic medalists in alpine skiing
Alpine skiers at the 2018 Winter Paralympics
Alpine skiers at the 2022 Winter Paralympics
Medalists at the 2018 Winter Paralympics
Medalists at the 2022 Winter Paralympics
21st-century Norwegian people